Kenneth John Bacon (born 2 March 1944) was a Labor Party member of the Tasmanian House of Assembly from 1998 until 2005.

He was the Minister for Tourism, Parks and Heritage in Paul Lennon's government from 2004 to 2005. He retired from parliament and the ministry due to ill health, effective as of 29 April 2005.

References

1944 births
Living people
Australian Labor Party members of the Parliament of Tasmania
Members of the Tasmanian House of Assembly
21st-century Australian politicians